Hartmann Schmige is a German screenplay, teleplay writer, and film director.  He is one of the founding members of the Verband Deutscher Drehbuchautoren (German Writers Guild).

Career

Hartmann Schmige studied journalism, sociology, and political science in Freiburg, Munich, and Berlin with a masters final thesis in the montage theories by Eisenstein, Kracauer and Bazin.

In the 1980s Hartmann Schmige became renowned for writing the Dieter Hallervorden feature films together with writer Christian Rateuke.  marks one of Hartmann Schmige's biggest successes. Some of the dialogue lines from the movie have reached cult status.

Hartmann Schmige continues his career as a German Television writer for German crime series and comedies.

Other works

Book: Eisenstein, Bazin, Kracauer |1977| About Film Montage Theory

Schmige also wrote the musical Schlemihl in 1987 together with Christian Rateuke. The music was composed by Wilhelm Dieter Siebert. Schmige and Siebert also wrote the opera libretto Der Untergang der Titanic (The Sinking of the Titanic) in 1980.

Filmography (selection)

Writing

Feature films
 (1983)
 (1984)
 (1985)

Television (episodic)
Wolffs Revier (1992–2000)
 (1995–1998)
 (1996–1997)

Other episodes (since 2000) for popular German crime series such as Sperling, Ein Fall für zwei, Der Ermittler and Tatort.

Television Film
Rotlicht (1992)
Engel sucht Flügel (2001)

Directing
 The Man in Pyjamas (1981)
Der Träumer (1982)

References

External links

Homepage
Verband Deutscher Drehbuchautoren

1944 births
Living people
German mass media people
German male writers
Male screenwriters